Route 475 or Highway 475 may refer to:

Canada
Manitoba Provincial Road 475
New Brunswick Route 475

Japan
 Japan National Route 475

United States 
  Interstate 475
  Florida State Road 475
  Louisiana Highway 475
  Maryland Route 475
  Mississippi Highway 475
  New Mexico State Road 475
  Pennsylvania Route 475
  Puerto Rico Highway 475
  Tennessee State Route 475
 Texas:
  Texas State Highway Loop 475
  Farm to Market Road 475
  Ranch to Market Road 475 (former)